The 2015 Catalunya GP2 Series round was a GP2 Series motor race held on May 9 and 10, 2015 at the Circuit de Catalunya in Spain. It was the second round of the 2015 GP2 Series. The race weekend supported the 2015 Spanish Grand Prix.

Stoffel Vandoorne took pole position and victory in the feature race, while Alex Lynn took the chequered flag in the sprint race.

Classification

Qualifying

Feature race

Sprint race

Standings after the round

Drivers' Championship standings

Teams' Championship standings

 Note: Only the top five positions are included for both sets of standings.

See also 
 2015 Spanish Grand Prix
 2015 Catalunya GP3 Series round

References

External links

GP2
Catalunya
May 2015 sports events in Spain